Jatiuca is a beach and a neighborhood situated in Maceió, capital city of Alagoas state, Brazil. Jatiuca Beach is surrounded by palm trees and blue water, and enjoys warm weather all around the year. Its beauty attracts many Brazilian and foreign tourists.

Geographic

Jatiúca is located in South Zone.

Climate

Jatiúca has a typical tropical climate, with warm to hot temperatures and high relative humidity all throughout the year. However, these conditions are relieved by a near absence of extreme temperatures and pleasant trade winds blowing from the ocean. January is the warmest month, with mean maxima of 31 °C and minima of 22 °C; July experiences the coolest temperatures, with means of 26 °C and 15 °C. The absolute maximum and minimum are respectively 33 °C and 11,3 °C.

Vegetation

Jatiúca has a Tropical forest. Rainforests are characterized by high rainfall, with definitions setting minimum normal annual rainfall between 2,000 mm (about 78 inches or 2 meters) and 1700 mm (about 67 inches). The soil can be poor because high rainfall tends to leach out soluble nutrients.

Demographics

According to the census 2006, the racial makeup of this district was majority White; minority Black or African American. People of Portuguese, Italian, Spanish, French, American and English descent form the largest ethnic groups.

Economy

Jatiúca has many Hotels and Pousadas (little hotels). Tourism is the most important segment in the district, because Jatiúca district has beautiful beaches on the coral coast.

Beaches of Brazil
Neighbourhoods in Maceió
Landforms of Alagoas